Katya Virshilas (born 10 September 1983) is a Lithuanian-Canadian dancer and actress.

Early life
Virshilas was born in Lithuania, to a Jewish family. She subsequently moved to Israel at age 6, and to Vancouver, British Columbia, Canada, at thirteen. She began dancing at the age of 13.

Career
She was a Vancouver British Columbia Dancesport Champion four times, from 1998 to 2002. In 2001, she and her partner won the Canadian Latin Dance Championship. Virshilas has appeared in the Hollywood films Shall We Dance? (2004), Take the Lead and John Tucker Must Die (both 2006), and in the television shows Smallville, Supernatural, Psych, and others.

Based in the United Kingdom from the start of her appearances in the BBC's Strictly Come Dancing series, she has since 2009 been professionally partnered with Danish dancer Klaus Kongsdal.

Virshilas toured the UK with Pasha Kovalev from 26 March 2012 in their own show.

Strictly Come Dancing 
She appeared as a professional dancer on series 7 (2009) of Strictly Come Dancing partnering cricketer Phil Tufnell. They were knocked out of the competition in week 9. On that week, they were in the bottom-two couples after a combination of the judges' points allocation and the audience's votes, alongside Ricky Groves and Erin Boag but were not saved by the judges.

Virshilas returned for the eighth series of the dancing show in autumn 2010 and was partnered with rugby player Gavin Henson.  In week 1 they scored 28 (their highest so far) and in week 4 they scored 23 for a tango to Britney Spears's "Toxic". However, were knocked out on the semi-final. In the ninth series, she was paired with Dan Lobb who was at the time one of the presenters of Daybreak. However, they were eliminated in week 3 of the competition.

On 20 June 2012, it was announced that Virshilas would not appear in the tenth series.

Highest and Lowest Scoring Per Dance

Series 7 - with celebrity partner Phil Tufnell

Series 8 - with celebrity partner Gavin Henson

Series 9 - with celebrity partner Dan Lobb

So You Think You Can Dance 
On the first series of the televised reality dancing competition So You Think You Can Dance, Virshilas choreographed or semi-choreographed four routines for different couples:

 Week 1 helped James Jordan with the choreography of Robbie White and Yanet Fuentes's American Smooth style foxtrot
 Week 2 choreographed (alongside professional partner Klaus) Mark Calape and Lizzie Gough's Viennese Waltz, which was highly praised by the judges
 Week 5 choreographed (alongside professional partner Klaus) Mandy Montanez and Alastair Postlethwaite's Paso Doble, which was criticized by the judges for the lack of passion, in particular, Nigel Lythgoe, series creator and judge, said it was the worst performance the pair had given over the course of the whole series
 Week 6 (final) choreographed (alongside professional partner Klaus) Lizzie Gough and Tommy Franzén's tango, much to the praise of the judges

Virshilas reappeared on the second series to choreograph more routines:
 Week 2 choreographed (alongside professional partner Klaus) Stephanie Powell and Gian Luca Loddo's cha-cha-cha, which was praised by the judges, despite Powell and Loddo being placed in the bottom two couples by public vote and consequently eliminated
 Week 2 choreographed (alongside professional partner Klaus) Alice Woodhouse and Charlie Wheeller's American Smooth style waltz, praised highly by the judges
 Week 7 choreographed (alongside professional partner Klaus) the boys' group Paso Doble performance (Lee Bridgman, Luke Jackson and Matt Flint)
 Week 8 (final) choreographed (alongside professional partner Klaus) Matt Flint and Kirsty Swain's American Smooth style waltz/foxtrot

Personal life
Virshilas started dating Klaus Kongsdal in 2009 after the two met at the BBC bar. They announced their engagement in January 2011. The couple married on Saturday 7 July 2012 in a chateau in Loire Valley, France.
The couple since then moved to Hong Kong and founded Ballroom Bees dance class for children below 6 years old, the dance courses are sold online and offline at YWCA.org and Kuddo. After Virshilas initially suffering a miscarriage in 2014, the couple had their first child, a boy, in May 2016.

References

External links

 Katya Virshilas in the dance drama "Take the Lead" with Antonio Banderas
Katya Virshilas and Pasha Kovalev

1983 births
20th-century Canadian actresses
21st-century Canadian actresses
Actresses from Vancouver
Canadian choreographers
Canadian expatriates in England
Canadian people of Lithuanian-Jewish descent
Canadian female dancers
Lithuanian Jews
Lithuanian expatriates in Canada
Canadian film actresses
Canadian television actresses
Jewish Canadian actresses
So You Think You Can Dance choreographers
Lithuanian expatriates in England
Living people
Canadian women choreographers